Renshou Temple is a Buddhist temple situated in downtown Foshan, Guangdong, China.

History

Renshou Temple was first built in the 13th year of Period Shunzhi (1656) in the Qing dynasty (1646–1911) by Chan master Zongtang. In the 8th year of the age of Kangxi of Kangxi Emperor, namely AD 1669, monk Yulin rebuilt the shanmen. In the 1st year of Period Xianfeng (1851), monk Renji reconstruction the temple.

In 1935, Li Peixian, a Chinese Tantric monk, donated property to establish the Ruyi Pagoda, whose canonization ceremony was held by Venerable Master Hsu Yun in 1938. 

In 1952, it was taken as a granary by the newly founded Communist government. After the Cultural Revolution in 1982, Xu Yeping and other lay Buddhists donated money to rebuild the temple. Shi Dashan was invited to serve as its abbot. On June 29, 1998, Renshou temple was officially opened to the public.

Architecture
Now the existing main buildings include the Shanmen, the Mahavira Hall and the Ruyi Pagoda. Ruyi Pagoda is a seven story octagonal pagoda which was inlaid with Tibetan tablets and plaques. There are more than ten porcelain Buddha statues inside the pagoda.

List of abbot
 Zongtang
 Yulin
 Zhiyuan
 Ciyun
 Shi Dashan
 Shi Mingsheng

References

External links

Buildings and structures in Foshan
Buddhist temples in Guangdong
Tourist attractions in Foshan
1656 establishments in China
17th-century Buddhist temples
Religious buildings and structures completed in 1656